A slalomboard is a skateboard, usually 60–80 cm long, with great
manoeuvring capability.

It enables the rider to brake or propel the board without touching the ground. This is achieved by correct body weight placement, together with short, intense swings (sometimes referred to as "pumping").

Slalomboards are typically used in slalom skateboard racing, where riders race through a slalom course set with plastic cones.

Slalomboards are practical as a means of city transportation since the board can easily be taken
onto public transport and ridden on sidewalks.

Skateboards